Homer Heck (September 29, 1936 – November 10, 2014) was an American businessman and politician.

Born in Branchland, West Virginia, Heck graduated from Huntington High School and served in the United States Army. He went to Marshall University and Texas Western University and received a degree from Alexander Hamilton Institute. He worked at Armco Steel, INCO Nickel Plant, in Huntington, West Virginia, and owned several businesses. He served in the West Virginia State Senate from 1980 to 1984 and then from 1988 to 1992 as a Democrat. He died in Huntington, West Virginia.

Notes

1936 births
2014 deaths
Politicians from Huntington, West Virginia
People from Lincoln County, West Virginia
Businesspeople from West Virginia
Marshall University alumni
University of Texas at El Paso alumni
Democratic Party West Virginia state senators
Military personnel from Huntington, West Virginia
20th-century American businesspeople